Pervomaiske is a village in Rozdilna Raion, Ukraine. It belongs to  Zakharivka settlement hromada, one of the hromadas of Ukraine. The village has a population of 290.

Until 18 July 2020, Pervomaiske belonged to Zakharivka Raion. The raion was abolished in July 2020 as part of the administrative reform of Ukraine, which reduced the number of raions of Odesa Oblast to seven. The area of Zakharivka Raion was merged into Rozdilna Raion.

References

External links
 Pervomaiske at the Verkhovna Rada of Ukraine site

Villages in Rozdilna Raion